In Australia, a conservation park is a type of specially protected status for land held by the Crown for conservation purposes.  A conservation park may consist of multiple conservation units.  As of June 2014, the term ‘Conservation Park’ is used only by the relevant government agencies in Queensland, South Australia and Western Australia.

List of Conservation Parks
Refer:

 List of conservation parks in Queensland
 List of conservation parks in South Australia
 List of conservation parks in Western Australia

See also
 Conservation in Australia
 Protected areas of Australia

References

 
Protected areas of Australia